Ripszima Székely (born 12 July 1936) is a Hungarian former swimmer. She competed in the women's 100 metre freestyle and the women's 400 metre freestyle at the 1956 Summer Olympics.

References

External links
 

1936 births
Living people
Hungarian female swimmers
Olympic swimmers of Hungary
Swimmers at the 1956 Summer Olympics
Swimmers from Budapest